The 1936–37 NCAA football bowl games were the final games of the 1936 college football season, and included the debuts of the Cotton Bowl Classic and Bacardi Bowl, which would complement the Orange, Rose, Sugar Bowl and Sun Bowl as the fifth and sixth post-season games.  This was the only season that the Bacardi Bowl was recognized by the NCAA.

Poll rankings
The below table lists top teams (per the AP Poll taken after the completion of the regular season), their win–loss records (prior to bowl games), and the bowls they later played in.

 The Big Ten Conference did not allow its members to participate in bowl games until the 1947 Rose Bowl.

Bowl schedule 
Rankings are from the final regular season AP Poll.

References